This is a list of Olympic medalists in sailing.

Current program

Men

Sailboard

One-person dinghy 
From 1996 to 2004, this discipline was open to both men and women, although all medals were won by men at these Games.

Two-person dinghy

Skiff 
From 2000 to 2008, this discipline was open to both men and women, although all medals were won by men at these Games.

Kiteboarding

Women

Sailboard

One-person dinghy

Two-person dinghy

Skiff

Kiteboarding

Mixed

Multihull 
From 1976 to 2008 this discipline was open (no gender restriction), instead of mixed (one male and one female for each boat). All medals were won by men at these Games.

Discontinued disciplines

Men

One-person heavyweight dinghy

Two-person keelboat 
From 1932 to 2000, this discipline was open to both men and women, although all medals were won by men at these Games.

Women

Three-person keelboat

Open

Three-person keelboat

Two-person heavyweight dinghy

International rule – 5.5 Metres and 6 Metres

International rule – 7 metres

International rule – 8 metres

International rule – 10 metres

International rule – 12 metres

Monotype

Rule of Jauge chemin de fer

Skerry cruiser

Ton classes

References 
 

Sailing
medalists by discipline